is a tokusatsu TV series.  Created by Shotaro Ishinomori, the series was produced by Toei Company and Ishimori Productions as part of the Toei Fushigi Comedy Series, and broadcast on Fuji Television from September 2, 1984 to March 31, 1985, with a total of 31 episodes.

Tokusatsu television series
1984 Japanese television series debuts
1985 Japanese television series endings
Japanese television shows featuring puppetry
Shotaro Ishinomori
Toei tokusatsu
Fuji TV original programming
Japanese comedy television series